The Free Homeland Alliance is a political alliance between five political parties in Armenia.

History 
The alliance was founded in May 2021 and subsequently announced its intention to participate in the 2021 Armenian parliamentary elections. Mikael Hayrapetyan was nominated to lead the alliance, while Andreas Ghukasyan was the bloc's candidate for prime minister. Following the election, the alliance won just 0.32% of the popular vote, failing to gain any representation in the National Assembly. The alliance had disputed the results of the election and claimed that the election was non-democratic. The alliance currently acts as an extra-parliamentary force.

Members 
Members of the alliance include:
Union for National Self-Determination
Armenian Constructive Party
Conservative Party
Green Party
National Democrats Union

Ideology 
The alliance was opposed to any political cooperation with Nikol Pashinyan or Robert Kocharyan. The alliance proposed to shift Armenia's geopolitical alignment towards Europe and the West and called for Armenia to enter a political and military alliance with France. The alliance believes that Armenian laws and legislation should be synced with European standards. During an interview on 15 June 2021, Andrias Ghukasyan stated that Russia is no longer an ally of Armenia and that Armenia should develop closer relations with the European Union and the United States.

In addition, the alliance supports the recognition of Artsakh's independence and also supports sustainable economic development, reducing taxes, improving the educational system, and strengthening Armenia's democracy and security.

Electoral record

See also

 Programs of political parties in Armenia

References 

Political parties established in 2021
Political party alliances in Armenia
2021 establishments in Armenia